Elbert is an unincorporated town, a post office, and a census-designated place (CDP) located in and governed by Elbert County, Colorado, United States. The CDP is a part of the Denver–Aurora–Lakewood, CO Metropolitan Statistical Area. The Elbert post office has the ZIP Code 80106. At the United States Census 2010, the population of the Elbert CDP was 230, while the population of the 80106 ZIP Code Tabulation Area was 4,232 including adjacent areas.

History
The Elbert post office has been in operation since 1875. The community takes its name from Elbert County.

The most significant flood events in Elbert County occurred in 1935, 1965, 1997, and 1999. The most damaging flood was in 1935, when flooding on Kiowa Creek destroyed three-fourths of the structures location in Elbert and resulted in nine deaths, seven of them in Elbert. Three-fourths of the town of Elbert was destroyed and not rebuilt.

On 11 January 1998 a fireball was seen over Elbert County. On 4 March 2000 a stone of 680.5 g was found in a field by the five year old Dustin Riffel on the property of his family. It was officially named "Elbert" and it was classified as an ordinary chondrite LL6.

On June 15, 2009, at 1:46 pm, a large three quarter mile-wide, EF2 tornado touched down in rural fields west of the town. The tornado came within  of the town at its closest. The tornado destroyed a barn at a farm and damaged an airplane hangar.

Today
In Elbert today you can find a small community with a lot of ranchers and farmers. The Elbert School was rebuilt and is one of the nicest schools in the state of Colorado.

Geography
Elbert is located in the valley of Kiowa Creek. Elbert Road leads north  to Kiowa and south  to Eastonville.

During the summer, Elbert is much busier due to a nearby Boy Scout camp, Peaceful Valley Scout Ranch, which has 10,000 visitors annually.  south of Elbert lies the JCC Ranch Camp, a Jewish camp owned by the Denver Jewish Community Center.

Demographics

Transportation
Elbert lies along Elbert Road, which connects the town of Kiowa to U.S. Highway 24. The largest nearby city is Castle Rock, which is about 45 minutes away via SH 86, which Elbert Road crosses at Kiowa. Colorado Springs is an hour drive via US 24.

See also

Outline of Colorado
Index of Colorado-related articles
State of Colorado
Colorado cities and towns
Colorado census designated places
Colorado counties
Elbert County, Colorado
Colorado metropolitan areas
Front Range Urban Corridor
North Central Colorado Urban Area
Denver-Aurora-Boulder, CO Combined Statistical Area
Denver-Aurora-Broomfield, CO Metropolitan Statistical Area

References

External links

Elbert @ Colorado.com
Elbert @ UncoverColorado.com
Elbert School District
Elbert Community Bulletin Board
Elbert County website
Elbert County Community Homepage

Census-designated places in Elbert County, Colorado
Census-designated places in Colorado
Denver metropolitan area